Daryll Meggatt (born 20 October 1990) is a Scottish footballer who plays as a left sided defender for  Darvel. Meggatt has previously played for Queen's Park, Alloa Athletic (twice), Dundee, Ayr United and East Fife.

Career
Meggatt began his footballing career at South Camlachie Amateurs, and signed with Queen's Park in June 2010. He made his senior debut on 21 August, in a 1–2 away loss against Albion Rovers. In the 2011–12 season, Meggatt was named in the PFA Scotland Third Division Team of the Year.

On 15 May 2012, Meggatt signed with Alloa Athletic. He was a part of the side who achieved promotion to the Scottish Championship in his first season, and made his division debut on 10 August 2013, in a 1–0 home win over Livingston.

On 16 April 2015, Meggatt signed a pre-contract agreement with Dundee, agreeing to join the club on a two-year deal at the beginning of the 2015–16 season. He left the club on 22 June 2016, his contract being cancelled by mutual consent. Shortly after leaving Dundee, Meggatt signed for Scottish Championship side Ayr United. He left the club in May 2017, having been unable to commit to full-time football, signing for fellow Scottish League One club Alloa Athletic on the same day. After struggling with injury, Meggatt left Alloa at the end of the 2017–18 season having made seventeen appearances for the side.

During the 2018 close season, Meggatt signed for East Fife on a onbe-year contract.

During the 2019 close season, Meggatt signed for Scottish Junior club Darvel. He was loaned to Stirling Albion in March 2021.

Career statistics

References

External links

1990 births
Living people
Scottish footballers
Association football fullbacks
Queen's Park F.C. players
Alloa Athletic F.C. players
Dundee F.C. players
Ayr United F.C. players
Scottish Football League players
Scottish Professional Football League players
Place of birth missing (living people)
East Fife F.C. players
Darvel F.C. players
Stirling Albion F.C. players
West of Scotland Football League players